Benjamin Davies (1813 – September 1904) was a merchant and political figure in Prince Edward Island, Canada. He represented 3rd Queens from 1850 to 1854 and 4th Queens from 1867 to 1876 in the Legislative Assembly of Prince Edward Island as a Liberal member.

Biography
He was born in Charlottetown, the son of Nathan Davies, an immigrant from Wales of Huguenot descent, and Amelia MacNutt. In 1813, he married Kezia Attwood Watts. Davies married Eliza Francis Cooke in 1854 after the death of his first wife. He was a lieutenant-colonel in the militia cavalry. Davies served in the province's Executive Council as Postmaster General, Colonial Secretary and chairman of the Railway Board.

He operated shipbuilding yards, owned a number of ships and was also an exporter of goods. Davies became ill during the winter of 1903-4 and died in Charlottetown later that year.

His son Louis Henry Davies became premier of Prince Edward Island and later served in the Supreme Court of Canada.

References

External links 
The Canadian parliamentary companion for 1875 HJ Morgan

1813 births
1904 deaths
Canadian people of Welsh descent
Colonial Secretaries of Prince Edward Island
People from Charlottetown
Prince Edward Island Liberal Party MLAs